The Blackstone Valley or Blackstone River Valley is a region of Massachusetts and Rhode Island.  It was a major factor in the American Industrial Revolution. It makes up part of the Blackstone River Valley National Heritage Corridor and National Historical Park.

History

National Heritage Corridor
The John H. Chafee Blackstone River Valley National Heritage Corridor follows the Blackstone Valley from Worcester to Providence, Rhode Island. The corridor follows the course of the Industrial Revolution in America from its origin at the Slater Mill in Pawtucket, Rhode Island as it first spread north along the valley to Worcester, Massachusetts, and then to the rest of the nation.

The region was designated a National Heritage Corridor by Congress in November 1986, composing 25 towns and cities throughout Massachusetts and Rhode Island.

National Historical Park
In 2011, a report recommended the region for National Park status. In 2014, the Blackstone River Valley National Historical Park was established.

Geography

Blackstone River

The river is named after William Blackstone (original spelling William Blaxton) who arrived in Weymouth, Massachusetts in 1623, and became the first European settler of present-day Boston in 1625.  He relocated again, to Rhode Island in 1635 and built his home on the river, in what would become Cumberland.  With the Providence River, the Blackstone was the northeastern border of Dutch claims for New Netherland from Adriaen Block's charting of Narragansett Bay in 1614 through the Hartford Treaty of 1650.

The original Native American name for the river was the "Kittacuck", which meant "the great tidal river". The "Kittacuck", or Blackstone, was plentiful with salmon and lamprey in pre-colonial and colonial times.

In 1790, Samuel Slater opened the first successful water powered cotton mill in America, Slater Mill, at Pawtucket Falls.  This mill was powered by the waters of the Blackstone River. Many other mills appeared along the Blackstone River over time making it an important part of American industry. The industrialization also led to the river being identified by the end of the 20th century as the primary source of Narragansett Bay pollution.

Blackstone Canal

The initiative for the canal came from Providence, where a merchant community wished to profit from trade with the farming country of the Blackstone Valley and Worcester County. The people of Worcester and the Blackstone Valley, eager for transport that would enable them to get better prices for their produce, welcomed the plan.  However, since the trade of central Massachusetts was at that time going overland through the port of Boston, Massachusetts commercial interests succeeded in stalling the project for several years.  Finally, in 1823, the  Blackstone Canal Company was organized through an act of the Massachusetts legislature, with a Rhode Island company soon following.  The canal's construction may have been motivated by competition among rival industrialists to curtail "water rights".

Construction began in 1825 and cost $750,000 (twice its initial estimate). The canal opened on October 7, 1828 when the packet boat Lady Carrington arrived in Worcester, the first vessel to make the trip. The canal brought immediate prosperity to Worcester and the Valley; farmers' profits increased and mills were built, especially in Worcester. Using water to transport goods was a great improvement over the rough roads of the era. At the time of its construction, it represented the best available transportation technology.

It was a two-day trip for the canal boats from Worcester to Providence and another two-day trip to return to Worcester. The overnight stopping point was in Uxbridge. Boston merchants moved to recapture the trade moving down the canal to Providence, opening a rail line to Worcester in 1835.  (Boston merchants opened three railroads in 1835, one to Lowell, one to Worcester, and one to Providence, RI. These were very new technology.) In 1847 the parallel Providence and Worcester Railroad began operation, and the canal closed in 1848.

The canal is listed in the National Register of Historic Places.

Recreation
The Blackstone Valley offers multiple recreation areas for visitors to take advantage of the sights. These sites are:
 Blackstone River and Canal Heritage State Park in Northbridge and Uxbridge.
 Douglas State Forest in Douglas.
 Lincoln Woods State Park in Lincoln.
 Purgatory Chasm State Reservation in Sutton.
 Upton State Forest in Upton.

Transportation
Multiple modes of transportation are available that serve the Blackstone Valley.

Roads
Two major roads travel through the region. Route 122 in Massachusetts is known as the Blackstone Canal Heritage Highway. The road travels through many of the region's mill villages. The other major road is Route 146 in Massachusetts and Rhode Island. Upgrades on the Massachusetts side have seen major economic benefits throughout the towns.

Rail

Two MBTA Commuter Rail lines, the Worcester and Providence Lines have stations located within the Blackstone Valley. Both lines provide direct service to Boston's South Station. Providence station is also served by Amtrak trains on the Northeast Corridor, providing service to New York City and beyond.

Demographics
At the 2010 United States Census, the population of the Blackstone Valley was 848,725.

See also
Greater Worcester Land Trust and list of other conservation organizations operating in the Blackstone River Valley

References

External links

Highway of Commerce: The Blackstone Canal, Worcester Historical Museum, 2005
Historic American Buildings Survey
Documents
1998 Map (PDF file)
An Historical Assessment of Anadromous Fish in the Blackstone River by Buckley and Nixon, U. Rhode Island, 2001
Blackstone River Watershed: Five Year Watershed Action Plan, Blackstone River Watershed Team, 2000

Geography of Worcester, Massachusetts
History of Massachusetts
History of Rhode Island
Landforms of Providence County, Rhode Island
Regions of Massachusetts
Regions of Rhode Island
River valleys of the United States
Valleys of Massachusetts
Valleys of Rhode Island